Bermeja is a phantom islet lying off the north coast of the Yucatán peninsula according to several maps of the Gulf of Mexico from the 16th to the 20th centuries. Despite being located somewhat precisely in relation to neighboring islands by notable Spanish cartographers of the 16th century, the island was not found in a 1997 survey, nor in an extensive 2009 study conducted by the National Autonomous University of Mexico (UNAM) on behalf of the Mexican Chamber of Deputies. Interest in the island arose in late 2008, fueled by the fact that if such an island existed, it would be important for determining the boundaries for exploitation rights of oil in Hoyos de Dona (Doughnut Holes) in the Gulf of Mexico.

The island was first mentioned by Alonso de Santa Cruz in El Yucatán e Islas Adyacentes, a list of islands of the region published in Madrid in 1539. Its precise location is given in Espejo de navegantes (Seville, ca. 1540) by Alonso de Chaves, who wrote that from a distance, the small island looks "blondish or reddish" (in Spanish: bermeja). According to Michel Antochiw Kolpa, a French-Mexican cartographer, since 1844 British maps have reported the sinking of the island some sixty fathoms below.

Explanations for its apparent disappearance include an erroneous observation by the early cartographers, shifts in the geography of the ocean floor, rising sea levels and conspiracy theories claiming that the Central Intelligence Agency destroyed the island to expand the economic zone allotted to the United States.

References

External links
 BBC World Service Documentary "Mexico's Missing Island"

Islands of Yucatán
Phantom islands of the Atlantic
Caribbean Sea
Uninhabited islands of Mexico